South Island nationalism refers to a nationalist movement in the South Island of New Zealand.

Julius Vogel, the 8th Premier of New Zealand, was a continual advocate of separation of the North and South Islands, which led to his dismissal from the Otago Daily Times in 1868. The idea of independence was voted on by the New Zealand Parliament in 1865, and the concern the South Island could form a separate colony was one of the main factors in moving the capital of New Zealand from Auckland to the more centrally located Wellington in the same year.

History

Māori period
The successive waves of Māori iwi (tribes) to settle the South Island – namely the Waitaha, the Ngāti Mamoe, and Ngāi Tahu – had been politically independent from their northern counterparts. Several attempts by the Ngāti Toa (from the Kapiti Coast) to annex the island during the 1830s, under the leadership of Te Rauparaha, were eventually repelled by an alliance of the Southern chiefs of Otautahi and Murihiku. By the time the first European settlers arrived in the South Island (then known natively as ) in the early 1840s, the Ngāti Toa only held control of the Wairau plains.

This independence from North Island iwi and their political beliefs is still reflected in modern South Island Māori culture. During Waitangi Day celebrations in 2010, Ngai Tahu refused to fly the controversial Tino Rangatiratanga flag, with one tribe member saying the "flag has been nothing but trouble".

There is also greater concern from South Island Maori in that the cultural renaming of Aotearoa does not reflect their ancestry link to their homeland of Aoraki/South Island. As Aotearoa referred solely to the north island but has been rolled out across the whole country with no consultation.

European discovery
The first Europeans known to reach the South Island were the crew of Dutch explorer Abel Tasman who arrived in his ships Heemskerck and Zeehaen. Tasman anchored in Golden Bay, at the northern end of the island, (he named it Murderers Bay) in December 1642 and sailed northward to Tonga following a clash with local Māori. Tasman sketched sections of the two main islands' west coasts. Tasman called them Staten Landt, after the States-General of the Netherlands, and that name appeared on his first maps of the country. Dutch cartographers changed the name to Nova Zeelandia in Latin, from Nieuw Zeeland, after the Dutch province of Zeeland. It was subsequently Anglicised as New Zealand by British naval captain James Cook of HM Bark Endeavour who visited the islands more than 100 years after Tasman during (1769–1770).

When Britain annexed New Zealand in 1840, New Zealand briefly became a part of New South Wales.<ref>A. H. McLintock (ed), An Encyclopaedia of New Zealand", 3 vols, Wellington, NZ:R.E. Owen, Government Printer, 1966, vol 3 p. 526.'</ref> This annexation was in response to New Zealand Company attempts to establish a separate colony in Wellington, and French claims in Akaroa, and so Lieutenant-Governor William Hobson declared British sovereignty over all of New Zealand on 21 May 1840 (the North Island by the Treaty of Waitangi and the South by discovery).

New Munster Province

When New Zealand was separated from the colony of New South Wales in 1841 and established as a colony in its own right, the Royal Charter effecting this provided that "the principal Islands, heretofore known as, or commonly called, the 'Northern Island', the 'Middle Island', and 'Stewart's Island', shall henceforward be designated and known respectively as 'New Ulster', 'New Munster', and 'New Leinster'". These divisions were at first of geographical significance only, not used as a basis for the government of the colony, which was centralised in Auckland. New Munster consisted of the South Island and the southern portion of the North Island, up to the mouth of the Patea River.

The situation was altered in 1846 when the New Zealand Constitution Act 1846. divided the colony into two provinces: New Ulster Province (the North Island), New Munster Province (the South Island and Stewart Island). Each province had its own Lieutenant-Governor and Legislative and Executive Council, in addition to the Governor-in-Chief and Legislative and Executive Council for the whole colony. Early in 1848 Edward John Eyre was appointed Lieutenant-Governor of New Munster. In 1851 the Provincial Legislative Councils were permitted to be partially elective.

The Provincial Council of New Munster had only one legislative session, in 1849, before it succumbed to the virulent attacks of the Wellington settlers. Governor George Grey, sensible to the pressures, inspired an ordinance of the General Legislative Council under which new Legislative Councils would be established in each province with two-thirds of their members elected on a generous franchise. Grey implemented the ordinance with such deliberation that neither Council met before advice was received that the United Kingdom Parliament had passed the New Zealand Constitution Act 1852.

This Act dissolved the New Ulster and New Munster provinces in 1853, after only seven years' existence, and New Munster was divided into the provinces of Canterbury, Nelson, and Otago. With the establishment of the New Zealand Parliament, James Macandrew the Superintendent of Otago Province fought what he saw as a bias towards central government at the expense of Otago. Similar resentment also occurred in other provinces, but the relative wealth of Otago (due to the 1861 gold rush) meant that it was felt there more strongly than elsewhere.

The provincial period

During the provincial period of 1853 to 1876, while the North Island was convulsed by the New Zealand Wars, the South Island, with its small Māori population, was largely peaceful and the southern provinces developed more rapidly than did those in the north. In 1861, gold was discovered at Gabriel's Gully in Central Otago, sparking a gold rush. Dunedin became the wealthiest city in the country, and many in the South Island resented financing the North Island's war and less ready to accept direction from a General Assembly whose impoverished members "looked with ill-concealed envy" on the resources of the South. It was, noted the Otago Colonist, "the sad but inevitable result of joining by artificial bonds of union countries that Nature (by Cook Strait) designed should be separate". Otago, argued its editor, Julius Vogel (who, ironically, was ultimately to lead the centralists to the abolition of provincialism), was in terms of shipping days three times as far from the capital of Auckland as it was from Victoria or Tasmania, and he looked forward to "a glorious future – the separation of the two islands". A well-attended public meeting in 1862 endorsed the principle of separation – though Southland, which had achieved independence from Dunedin only by appealing to central government, and Canterbury, understanding that Dunedin saw itself as the South Island's capital-to-be, were both unenthusiastic.

A "Southern Separation League" was formed, but Vogel had by then recognised the signs of decay in the provincial system. Seeing that the weaker provinces were heading for insolvency, he opted in favour of centralism – and promptly changed his electorate to stand for a northern seat.

In an attempt to hold her place as a capital of some description, in 1865 Auckland joined forces with Otago to support a resolution in the General Assembly calling for independence for both islands. They lost by 31 votes to 17. In the same year the political concerns of the South Island provinces prompted the colonial government to move the capital south from Auckland to Wellington. By 1870 only Canterbury and Otago could be said to be flourishing.

The modern era
In a 2006 feature article in the New Zealand Listener on the future of a wind farm in Central Otago, Bruce Ansley expressed the view that the South Island independence movement is kicking back into gear.

In 2007, Richard Prosser called for the establishment of a South Island Parliament as part of a New Zealand Confederation. Mr Prosser later stood as the New Zealand First candidate for the Waimakariri electorate in the 2011 general election and was elected as a list MP. Several internet based groups advocate their support for an independent South Island.

The March 2010 issue of North & South magazine featured an article entitled "The Great Divide" which sought to explain the geographic, cultural and language differences between the North and South Islands through a panel of guest writers.

South Island identity
Anna Rogers, a Christchurch writer, once said "[South Island identity is] based on the kinder, cheaper, less-harried lifestyle of the South Island, as compared, most notably, with Auckland." The Southern man remains a familiar stock character throughout the country.

Active and inactive nationalist groups
The NZ South Island Party was a New Zealand political party which was established to gain more representation for the South Island. The party stood for the 1999 election but they won no seats. In 2002 the party's registration was cancelled.
South Island First is a political pressure group which serves as an umbrella group for various advocates and supporters of South Island self-determination. Because it focuses on a single issue, members can belong to any political party or none. Discussion about issues such as left/right politics, the monarchy/republic debate and so on, are sidelined in favour of uniting the self-determination movement. South Island First has no wider political policies whatsoever and the campaign is intended to be wide enough to include all South Islanders and those sympathisers who live outside of the historical area of New Munster.
 The New Munster Party was a social democratic and nationalist political party that is committed to the creation of an independent Republic of New Munster. Created in 2010 and still active in 2011, its objective was to give New Munster the necessary institutions for its economic, social, cultural, environmental and political development. Its aspirations included regional autonomy comparable to European regions such as Scotland, or full independence, as with Ireland.
 The South Island Independence Movement (S.I.I.M) is a current secessionist group dedicated to establishing the South Island as an separate Nation independent from New Zealand. The Organization was founded and currently headed by Solomon Tor-Kilsen. 

Flag concepts for the South Island

Because New Zealand is a unitary state rather than a federation, there are no specific flags used to represent the two main islands or most of the minor islands other than the national flag (with the exceptions of the Chatham Islands and Stewart Island/Rakiura). Three designs have been privately proposed for a South Island flag.

James Dignan's concept
Vexillologist James Dignan proposed a flag including the Southern Cross stars that appear on the New Zealand national flag, with a depiction of the Southern Alps (the white peak) and the forests and fields of the south (the green inset). The Southern Alps are the South Island's most prominent geological feature, and agriculture and forestry the main primary industries, making this concept an appropriate representation.

Dean Thomas' concept
Dean Thomas proposed a flag that reflects early Māori Flags. In this concept, the white background represents the snow of the Southern Alps while the red stripe represents the people (Māori and European populace). The New Zealand White Ensign is placed in the canton so as to blend in with the white background colour.  Te Wai Pounamu'' is the Māori name for the South Island.

The New Munster Cross
The New Munster Cross is promoted by the political lobby group South Island First and the New Munster Party. It consists of a Nordic Cross with white background representing the Southern Alps, a green cross representing the lush bush and farmland of the South Island and blue representing the ocean.

References

See also
List of active autonomist and secessionist movements
Bombay Hills

South Island
Nationalist movements in Oceania
Independence movements
Separatism in New Zealand